2nd Armoured Brigade or 2nd Armored Brigade may refer to:

2nd Armoured Brigade (Australia)
2nd Armoured Brigade (France)
2nd Armoured Brigade (Poland)
2nd Armoured Brigade (United Kingdom)
2nd Canadian Armoured Brigade